David McFarlan (3 October 1862 – 2 January 1940) was a Scotland international rugby union player.

Rugby Union career

Amateur career

He went to Loretto School in Edinburgh.

Recruited by Bill Maclagan, he then played for London Scottish.

He played in a charity match for a combined London Scottish and London Welsh side against a combined London side in 1886.

International career

He was called up to the Scotland squad and played Wales at Raeburn Place, Edinburgh on 8 January 1883. It was the first of his 8 caps for Scotland.

Death

The Surrey Advertiser of 6 January 1940 reported his death:
DEATH OF MR. D. J. McFARLAN 
Former international footballer.
A former international footballer, who captained the Scottish side for five years, Mr. David James McFarlan, of Sandcroft, Pyrford Heath, Pyrford, died on Tuesday the age of 77. He was on the way to his office in London, and had just alighted from a bus when he had a heart attack. He collapsed and died almost immediately. He had a serious illness a year ago but made a good recovery. In his time Mr McFarlan was a promising ail-round athlete. He captained the Scottish football team in 1883, 1884, 1886, and 1889. He was also a good cricketer, and was formerly captain of the Madras Club. He was also a member of the M.C.C. Mr. McFarlan came to Pyrford from Sunninghill 20 years ago. He played cricket for the late Mr. Carlos Clarke’s team at Sunninghill; for the late Mr Stoop’s team at Old Byfleet; and for Pyrford. He could still be relied upon to make plenty of runs the his later years, and he did not give up game until he was sixty. McFarlan was a partner in the firm Messrs. Leslie and Anderson, of Billiterstreet, London, East Indian merchants. He the son of Gen. David McFarlan. and was the head of the Clan McFarlan. He had a residence in Scotland at Nether Auchendrane, near Ayr. Mr. McFarlan leaves a widow. The funeral took place yesterday (Friday) at Golders Green.

References

1862 births
1940 deaths
People educated at Loretto School, Musselburgh
Scottish rugby union players
Scotland international rugby union players
London Scottish F.C. players
Rugby union centres